U96 is a German musical project formed by DJ and producer Alex Christensen, and a team of producers named Matiz (Ingo Hauss, Helmut Hoinkis, and Hayo Lewerentz). After a decade-long hiatus, the band returned in 2018 without Christensen and Hoinkis.

History

Das Boot: 1991–1992
The name of the project comes from the film Das Boot about German submarine U-96 from World War II. The project's first hit, "Das Boot" (1991), is a techno adaptation of the film's title melody, which had been originally composed by Klaus Doldinger. An album of the same name was also released.

Replugged: 1993
The band's next album, Replugged (1993), was inspired by the electro sounds of the 1980s and by ambient and disco music themes. It was less commercially successful than its predecessor, but achieved three top-10 hits: "Love Sees No Colour", "Night in Motion", and "Inside Your Dreams", which peaked at number 1 in Finland. Although uncredited, Ingo Hauss provided most male vocals for this album.

Club Bizarre: 1994–1995
The follow-up album, Club Bizarre (1995), radically changed the group's sound. It was dominated by a fast-paced Eurodance sound with a significant rave influence. The hit single releases from this album were "Love Religion" (with Daisy Dee) as well as the title track "Club Bizarre", with harmonies that were reused later by Brooklyn Bounce. Motor Music also released the Club Bizarre Interactive CD-ROM. The audio part of this CD included several music tracks and the multimedia part featured a discography, interviews with Alex Christensen, and a game for Mac OS and Windows PC.

Heaven: 1996
In 1996, U96's fourth album, Heaven, was released. It was highly commercial in sound, with greater emphasis on Eurodance, despite retaining some electro and rave influences. On this album, a new singer, Dea-Li (Dorothy Lapi), was featured, who participated in the production of four titles. The chorus in the song "Heaven"—although with a faster pace and different text—closely resembles Cyndi Lauper's 1984 hit "Time After Time". The second single, "A Night to Remember", was a top-20 hit in Austria and Finland. The final single, "Venus in Chains", peaked at number 7 in the Czech Republic.

Hiatus, Reboot: 1997–present
After their fourth album, the group released the singles "Seven Wonders" (1997), "Energie" (1998), "Beweg Dich, Baby" (1998), and "Das Boot 2001" (2000), before issuing the compilation Best of 1991–2001, which included a few songs from the unreleased album Rhythm of Life. They returned to the German Top 30 in 2006 with "Vorbei", which featured vocals by Ben.

Another album, Out of Wilhelmsburg, was released in 2007, albeit with a different group lineup, before the band went on an indefinite hiatus.

In June 2018, U96 came out with the double album Reboot. Two years later, in collaboration with Wolfgang Flür, they released another double album, titled Transhuman.

Helmut Hoinkis died on 19 February 2021.

Band members

Current members
 Ingo Hauss (aka Bela Lagonda)
 Hayo Lewerentz (aka Harry Castioni / Hayo Panarinfo)

Past members
 Helmut Hoinkis (aka Jeff Wycombe)
 Alex Christensen (aka AC 16, AC Beat, Alex C.)
 Stefan Hafelinger
 Skadi Lange
 Dorothy Lapi

Discography

Albums

Singles

References

External links
 Alex Christensen's official website
 U96 discography
 [ AllMusicGuide profile]
 History of U96

Musical groups established in 1991
German electronic music groups
German Eurodance groups
Musical groups from Hamburg
Polydor Records artists